Jim Stacey (born in Southend-on-Sea) is a British guitarist. As a guitarist he's best known as a (former) member of the German heavy metal band Accept.

Career

Stacey was a member of the German band Break Point and played on their only album First Serving in 1981. He joined Accept during 1989. In that year, Accept released their eighth studio album, Eat the Heat. Although Stacey appears on the album's front cover, all the guitar work on the album was played by Wolf Hoffmann. Jim Stacey did perform second guitar live with the band.

Stacey was responsible for the layout design and package design of the Nashville Pussy debut album Let Them Eat Pussy (1998).

He was one of the composers of Kevin Henderson's album Kentucky Bound (2005).

Discography

References

English heavy metal guitarists
English male guitarists
Living people
Accept (band) members
People from Southend-on-Sea
Year of birth missing (living people)